Volzhsky (masculine), Volzhskaya (feminine), or Volzhskoye (neuter) is the name of several inhabited localities in Russia.

Urban localities
Volzhsky, Volgograd Oblast, a city in Volgograd Oblast
Volzhsky, Samara Oblast, an urban-type settlement in Krasnoyarsky District of Samara Oblast

Rural localities
Volzhsky, Astrakhan Oblast, a settlement in Srednevolzhsky Selsoviet of Yenotayevsky District of Astrakhan Oblast
Volzhsky, Nizhny Novgorod Oblast, a settlement in Rabotkinsky Selsoviet of Kstovsky District of Nizhny Novgorod Oblast
Volzhsky, Orenburg Oblast, a settlement in Volzhsky Selsoviet of Kurmanayevsky District of Orenburg Oblast
Volzhsky, Yaroslavl Oblast, a settlement in Rodionovsky Rural Okrug of Tutayevsky District of Yaroslavl Oblast
Volzhskoye, Astrakhan Oblast, a selo in Volzhsky Selsoviet of Narimanovsky District of Astrakhan Oblast
Volzhskoye, Ulyanovsk Oblast, a selo in Zhedyayevsky Rural Okrug of Staromaynsky District of Ulyanovsk Oblast
Volzhskaya (rural locality), a village in Kineshemsky District of Ivanovo Oblast